Halton is a district of east Leeds, West Yorkshire, England, situated between Cross Gates to the north, Halton Moor to the west, Colton to the east and Whitkirk to the South. Temple Newsam lies directly south of the estate.

The area falls into the Temple Newsam ward of Leeds City Council and Leeds East parliamentary constituency.

Etymology
The name of Halton is first attested in the Domesday Book of 1086, in the forms Halletun and Halletune. The name comes from the Old English words halh ('nook, corner of land') and tūn ('farm, estate'), and thus once meant 'estate in a corner of land'.

The parish also contains Halton Deans, first attested in the period 1170–90 in Latin or French form, as denam de Haleton, and in English form in the same century as Haletun dene and variants thereof. The deans element here comes from the Old English word denu ('valley'); the -s appears to have been added after the medieval period.

History

Halton was originally developed as a village on the main road linking Leeds and Selby. Development immediately before and after the Second World War, saw Halton grow substantially into a suburb of Leeds.

St Wilfrid's Church in Halton is a grade II* listed church built in 1939 at a cost of £11,700 and designed by A. Randall Wells.  The church is in the Arts and Crafts style and still has many of the original fittings designed by Wells as well as contemporary art by Eric Gill.

Demographics
Halton is a suburban area of mainly owner-occupied housing of which almost three-quarters is semi detached or detached. The area compares favourably with Leeds as a whole in relation to indicators of deprivation, with relatively low levels of crime and anti-social behaviour, low levels of households in receipt of means-tested and out-of-work benefits and high levels of educational attainment. The area has a low level of people from BME backgrounds.

Local facilities and attractions

The main Public Houses of Halton were the Irwin Arms (now demolished), The Travellers Rest (now demolished) and The Woodman.

There is a Lidl, Tesco Express and Fultons supermarkets.

The local Primary School is named Templenewsam Halton Primary School, with Whitkirk Primary also being within the local area.

Notable people
Beryl Burton – cyclist  
Christabel Burniston – founder of the English Speaking Board

Location grid

See also
Listed buildings in Leeds (Temple Newsam Ward)

References

Further reading
John Gilleghan (2004) Halton The Story of an East Leeds Village (Kingsway Press)

External links
  - Halton was in this parish

Places in Leeds